The 1971 Pulitzer Prize went to the following:

Journalism awards

Public Service:
 Winston-Salem Journal and Sentinel, for investigation of environmental problems, particularly blocking strip mine operations in northwest North Carolina.
National Reporting:
 Lucinda Franks and Thomas Powers of United Press International, for their profile of revolutionary Diana Oughton, "The Making of a Terrorist".
Local General or Spot News Reporting:
 Staff of the Akron Beacon Journal, for coverage of the Kent State shootings on May 4, 1970.
Local Investigative Specialized Reporting:
 William Jones of the Chicago Tribune, for exposing "collusion between police and some of Chicago's largest ambulance companies to restrict services in low income areas."
International Reporting:
 Jimmie Lee Hoagland of The Washington Post, for covering the struggle against apartheid in South Africa.
Criticism or Commentary:
 William A. Caldwell of The Record (Hackensack, New Jersey), for his commentary in his daily column, "Simeon Stylites".
 Harold C. Schonberg of The New York Times, for his music criticism in 1970.
Editorial Writing:
 Horace G. Davis, Jr. of The Gainesville Sun, for his editorials in support of peaceful desegregation in Florida schools.
Editorial Cartooning:
 Paul Conrad of the Los Angeles Times, for his cartooning in 1970.
Spot News Photography:
 John Paul Filo of the Valley Daily News/Daily Dispatch (Tarentum and New Kensington, Pennsylvania), for his photography of the Kent State shootings.
Feature Photography:
 Jack Dykinga of the Chicago Sun-Times, for his photography at the Lincoln and Dixon State Schools for the Retarded (Illinois).

Letters, Drama and Music Awards

Fiction:
 No award given.
Drama:
 The Effect of Gamma Rays on Man-in-the-Moon Marigolds by Paul Zindel (Harper)
History:
 Roosevelt: The Soldier of Freedom by James MacGregor Burns (Harcourt)
Biography or Autobiography:
 Robert Frost: The Years of Triumph, 1915-1938 by Lawrance Thompson (Holt)
Poetry:
 The Carrier of Ladders by William S. Merwin (Atheneum)
General Non-Fiction:
 The Rising Sun by John Toland (Random)
Music:
 Synchronisms No. 6 for Piano and Electronic Sound (1970) by Mario Davidovsky (E. B. Marks) Premiered August 19, 1970, at the Berkshire Music Festival.

References

Sources
 

Pulitzer Prizes by year
Pulitzer Prize
Pulitzer Prize